Bengalai or Bangali is a town in Puran Shangla District of Khyber Pakhtunkhwa, situated between Aloch and Sundavi villages. The SMC Hospital 're situated between Aloch and Bangali, Puran 

Cities and towns in Shangla District